Chris Xu (born 4 February 1969), born Xu Guanghong, is a Chinese-born table tennis player who represented Canada at the 2000 Summer Olympics. Her doubles partner Xiao-Xiao Wang was also from her hometown Harbin in China.

References

External links
 
 

1969 births
Living people
Canadian female table tennis players
Olympic table tennis players of Canada
Table tennis players at the 2000 Summer Olympics
Commonwealth Games medallists in table tennis
Commonwealth Games bronze medallists for Canada
Pan American Games medalists in table tennis
Pan American Games gold medalists for Canada
Pan American Games silver medalists for Canada
Chinese emigrants to Canada
Naturalized citizens of Canada
Naturalised table tennis players
Table tennis players from Harbin
Table tennis players at the 1995 Pan American Games
Table tennis players at the 1999 Pan American Games
Table tennis players at the 2007 Pan American Games
Table tennis players at the 2002 Commonwealth Games
Medalists at the 1995 Pan American Games
Medalists at the 1999 Pan American Games
Medalists at the 2007 Pan American Games
Medallists at the 2002 Commonwealth Games